Nelly Meden (1928–2004) was an Argentine film, stage and television actress.

Selected filmography
 White Horse Inn (1948)
 Los secretos del buzón (1948)
 La serpiente de cascabel (1948)
 The Unwanted (1951)
 The Count of Monte Cristo (1953)
 El Último perro (1956)
 The Whole Year is Christmas (1960)
 This Earth Is Mine (1961)
 By Killing (1965)

References

Bibliography 
 Klossner, Michael. The Europe of 1500-1815 on Film and Television: A Worldwide Filmography of Over 2550 Works, 1895 Through 2000. McFarland & Company, 2002.

External links 
 

1928 births
2004 deaths
Actresses from Rosario, Santa Fe
Argentine stage actresses
Argentine film actresses
Argentine television actresses